Cameron City Pool-PWA Project 1196 is a historic swimming pool located at Cameron, Marshall County, West Virginia. It was built in 1939, with a grant from the Public Works Administration.  It consists of a semi-circular pool with underwater lifeguard station, and a wooden bath house.  It incorporates a beach area and is recognized as a potential fire fighting emergency water reserve.

It was listed on the National Register of Historic Places in 1993.

References

Buildings and structures completed in 1939
Buildings and structures in Marshall County, West Virginia
Buildings and structures on the National Register of Historic Places in West Virginia
Municipal parks in West Virginia
National Register of Historic Places in Marshall County, West Virginia
Public Works Administration in West Virginia
Swimming venues in the United States